Amy Tipton is an American film and television actress. She is also a voice actress and an art coordinator.

Early life and education
She was born in Fayetteville, Georgia.

Career

Acting
Since 1992, Tipton has worked as an actress in at least six films and eight television productions including guest appearances in the television series One Tree Hill, Little Britain USA, and Unscripted.

She has voiced a number of anime characters, and is the English-language voice of Pai Chan in the anime series Virtua Fighter.

Tipton also voiced the role of Aoi Futaba in the television series You're Under Arrest!

Filmography

Voice-acting roles
Babel II — Beyond Infinity as Aira (television)
Clamp School Detectives as Miyuki, Hikori
Red Dead Redemption 2 as The Local Pedestrian Population (videogame)
Soccer Dog: European Cup as Group Walla
The 27 Club as TV Reporter
Virtua Fighter as Pai Chan (television)
Voogie's Angel as Voogie
You're Under Arrest! as Aoi Futaba

Other acting filmography and television work
Navy NCIS: Naval Criminal Investigative Service (2005) as Liza Taylor (television series)
New Disguise (2005) (film)
Unscripted (2005) as Acting Student (television series)
Four the Roses (2006) (film)
One Tree Hill (2007) as Flight Attendant (television series)
Reinventing the Wheelers (2007)  Leanne  (television film)
Little Britain USA (2008) as Mommy #1 (television series)
One Tree Hill (2008) as Waitress (television series)
The Conjuring (2013) as Camilla
Homeland (2013) as Lisa (television series)
Hidden Figures (2016) as Crying Woman

Art coordinator work
Playing With Toy Guns (2010)
A Good Old Fashioned Orgy (2011)
One Tree Hill (2006–2012) – 53 episodes
Revolution (2012) – 6 episodes
Banshee (2013) – 5 episodes
Christmas in Conway (2013)
Tammy (2014)
The Squeeze (2015)
The Walking Dead (2016–2019) – 34 episodes

References

External links

Crystal Acids

American film actresses
American television actresses
American voice actresses
Living people
Actresses from Atlanta
21st-century American actresses
Year of birth missing (living people)